The Starr carbine was a breechloading single-shot rifle used by the United States Army. Designed in 1858, the Starr was primarily used by cavalry soldiers in the American Civil War.

History
In January 1858, Ebenzer Starr submitted his design for a single-shot, breech-loading rifle to the Washington Armory for evaluation. During testing, the rifle was noted to have no misfires, and its accuracy was considered better than average. Testers commented that if the gas seal could be improved, the weapon would be better than its rival, the Sharps carbine.

The rifle was adopted as the Model 1858 carbine. Between 1861 and 1864, over 20,000 were produced by the Starr Arms Company of Yonkers, New York. The Model 1858 was designed to fire paper or linen cartridges. In 1865, the government ordered 3,000 Starr carbines chambered to use metal cartridge. These proved to be successful, and an additional 2,000 were ordered.

Although the Starr carbine had proven to be effective during the Civil War, it was not successful during the trials of 1865 by the U.S. Army trials board, and no further rifles were ordered.

During the war, the Starr Arms Company had been the fifth largest supplier of carbines and the third largest supplier of .44 caliber single action pistols. After the war had ended, and with no further government contracts, Starr could no longer compete with larger manufacturers like Winchester, Sharps, and Colt, and the company closed its doors in 1867.

Design and features
The Starr carbine was similar in design to the Sharps carbine. The Starr had a longer receiver and a distinctive web between the tail of the breech lever and the underside of the butt.

The Starr carbine had a .54 caliber barrel that was 21 inches in length. The weapon had an overall length of 37.65 inches and a weight of 7.4 lbs. A bayonet could not be fitted.

The Starr carbine had a three-position rear sight composed of a standing block and two folding leaves.

The Starr carbine fired paper or linen cartridges that were ignited by conventional percussion caps. The weapon fired reliably as long as the lengthy flash channel was kept clean.

Variants
The Starr carbine was produced in two versions, the Model 1858 and the Model 1865. The Model 1858 could fire linen or paper cartridges made by Starr, and could also fire similar cartridges made for the Sharps carbine. The Model 1865 version fired the metal 56-50 Spencer rimfire cartridge, and as a result, had a significantly redesigned hammer and breech block.

See also
 Rifles in the American Civil War

References

American Civil War rifles
Carbines
Eban Starr design
Rifles of the United States
Falling-block rifles
Guns of the American West